Mushulatubbee (Choctaw , "Determined to Kill") (born c. 1750–1770, died c. 1838) was the chief of the Choctaw Okla Tannap ("Lower Towns"), one of the three major Choctaw divisions during the early 19th century.  When the Principal Chief Greenwood LeFlore stayed in Mississippi at the time of removal, Mushulatubbee was elected as principal chief, leading the tribe to Indian Territory.

In 1812 he had led his warriors to assist General Andrew Jackson in the war against the Creek Red Sticks, known as the Creek Wars.

In December 1824 Mushulatubbee was one of three principal chiefs leading a Choctaw delegation to Washington to seek help against encroaching European-American settlers. Pushmataha and Apuckshunubbee were the other chiefs; Apuckshunubbee, age 80, died before they reached Washington, and Pushmataha died of smallpox in the capital soon after their meeting with the government.

On 26 September 1830, together with the Principal Chief Greenwood LeFlore and others, Mushulatubbee signed the Treaty of Dancing Rabbit Creek, which ceded to the US government most of the remaining Choctaw territory in Mississippi and Alabama in exchange for territory in Indian Territory.  Other spellings for his name include: Mosholetvbbi, AmoshuliTvbi, Musholatubbee, Moshaleh Tubbee, and Mushulatubba.

Mushulatubbee.

Early life

The Shawnee leader Tecumseh visited Mushulatubbee in 1811 when he travelled south to gain indigenous support for his confederacy, in an effort to resist the expansion of the United States onto Native lands. Tecumseh met Mushulatubbee, then the chief of the Okla Tannap (Lower Towns), the southern region of the three major Choctaw areas of settlement, in the village of Mashulaville. Mushulatubbee sympathized with Tecumseh's cause, but felt he was too old to assist the confederacy, so remained neutral in the ongoing war between the U.S. and Tecumseh.

From 1813 to 1814, Mushulatubbee fought in the Creek War alongside the United States against the Red Sticks, a Muscogee faction attempting to resist U.S. expansion in the American South. A year later, Mushulatubbee again fought alongside the U.S. against British forces during the War of 1812. During the Battle of New Orleans in 1815, Mushulatubbee led 52 Choctaw warriors against British pickets which had been established in local bayous, killing several soldiers and demoralizing others. After the battle concluded in an American victory, Mushulatubbee and his warriors returned home after officially announcing their departure on January 27, 1815 at Fort Stoddard.

Land cessions

Under continuing pressure from European-American settlers and the United States government, Mushulatubbee signed the Treaty of Choctaw Trading House on 24 October 1816, and the Treaty Ground on 18 October 1820 to cede land. The US failed to prevent settlers from continuing to encroach on Choctaw territory.

Journey to Washington
In 1824, Pushmataha, Mushulatubee, and Apuckshunubbee, the three chiefs of the Choctaw regional divisions, became concerned about the encroaching settlement of European Americans and the unwillingness of local authorities to respect Indian land titles.  They still hoped to offset the government's push for removal west of the Mississippi River and resolved to take their case to the Federal government in Washington, D.C.  Pushmataha led the delegation; they sought either expulsion of white settlers from deeded lands in Arkansas, or compensation in land and cash for such lands. The group also consisted of Talking Warrior, Red Fort, Nittahkachee, Col. Robert Cole and David Folsom, both (mixed-race) Choctaw; Captain Daniel McCurtain; and Major John Pitchlynn, the U.S. Interpreter.

They planned to travel the Natchez Trace to Nashville, then to Lexington, Kentucky; onward to Maysville, Kentucky; across the Ohio River (called the Spaylaywitheepi by the Shawnee) northward to Chillicothe, Ohio (former principal town of the Shawnee); then finally east over the "National Highway" to Washington City.

While in Washington, the chief also met with the Marquis de Lafayette, who was visiting Washington, D.C. for the last time.  He hailed him as a fellow aged warrior who, though foreign, rose to high renown in the American cause.

Candidate for U.S. Congress
In 1830 Mushulatubbee announced his candidacy for office in Mississippi in the Port Gibson Correspondent, as reported by the Christian Mirror and N.H. Observer (15 July 1830).

  

The US government forced the Choctaw to remove to Indian Territory west of the Mississippi River.  Mushulatubbee was the chief of his division during the removal and for a time after their resettlement in what became Oklahoma. The government had encouraged the Choctaw to resettle in their former clan divisions.  Relocation soon led to changes in the society in which those clan divisions became less important.

In 1838 Mushulatubbee died of smallpox in present-day Arkansas and was buried near Cameron, Oklahoma in Le Flore County, Oklahoma.

See also

Apuckshunubbee
Pushmataha
Greenwood LeFlore
George W. Harkins
Peter Pitchlynn
Phillip Martin
List of Choctaw chiefs
List of Choctaw treaties

Notes

References
Lafarge, Oliver. A Pictorial History of the American Indian, Crown Publishers, Inc., 1956: 41.

External links
"History", Choctaw Nation Official Website
"Choctaw Removal: Assessment of Mushulatubbee's role", Mississippi History

18th-century births
1830s deaths
Battle of New Orleans
Chiefs of the Choctaw
Native American leaders
Native Americans in the War of 1812
Native American history of Mississippi
Native American slave owners